Clinton is a town in Middlesex County, Connecticut, United States. The population of the town was 13,185 at the 2020 census. The town center along the shore line was listed as a census-designated place (CDP) by the U.S. Census Bureau in the 2020 census.

Geography

Clinton is bordered by the towns of Madison on the west, Westbrook on the east, and Killingworth on the north. Clinton is directly from Long Island Sound. The town has one town beach named Clinton Beach. Many fishers come to Clinton to catch bluefish.

The town center is known as Clinton Center. It is the location of the Clinton Village Historic District, which is listed on the National Register of Historic Places.

Cedar Island is located in Clinton Harbor.

Other minor communities and geographic features in Clinton are Beach Park, Boulder Lake, Clinton Beach, Cow Hill, Duck Hole, Grove Beach, Grove Beach Manor, Harbor View, Kelseytown, Lochwood, Mill District, Old Harbor Village, Ridgewood, Riverside, and Silver Bluff.

Demographics

At the 2000 census there were 13,094 people, 5,134 households, and 3,614 families living in the town. The racial makeup of the town was 95.85% White, 0.57% Black or African American, 0.29% Native American, 1.13% Asian, 0.02% Pacific Islander, 1.02% from other races, and 1.12% from two or more races. Hispanic or Latino of any race were 3.99%.

Of the 5,134 households 33.4% had children under the age of 18 living with them, 59.1% were married couples living together, 8.4% had a female householder with no husband present, and 29.6% were non-families. 23.7% of households were one person and 8.7% were one person aged 65 or older. The average household size was 2.55 and the average family size was 3.04.

The age distribution was 25.1% under the age of 18, 5.8% from 18 to 24, 31.1% from 25 to 44, 26.7% from 45 to 64, and 11.3% 65 or older. The median age was 38 years. For every 100 females, there were 93.7 males. For every 100 females age 18 and over, there were 91.4 males.

The median household income was $60,471 and the median family income  was $71,403. Males had a median income of $47,363 versus $34,983 for females. The per capita income for the town was $26,080. About 2.0% of families and 4.2% of the population were below the poverty line, including 4.8% of those under age 18 and 3.9% of those age 65 or over.

CDP demographics

The town center is listed as the Clinton Census Designated Place. At the 2000 census there were 3,516 people, 1,515 households, and 895 families living in the CDP. The population density was 1,451.5 inhabitants per square mile (561.0/km). The racial makeup of the CDP was 95.11% White, 0.63% Black or African American, 0.26% Native American, 1.19% Asian, 0.03% Pacific Islander, 1.42% from other races, and 1.37% from two or more races. Hispanic or Latino of any race were 6.74%.

Of the 1,515 households 28.2% had children under the age of 18 living with them, 46.2% were married couples living together, 9.9% had a female householder with no husband present, and 40.9% were non-families. 32.3% of households were one person and 12.1% were one person aged 65 or older. The average household size was 2.32 and the average family size was 2.98.

The age distribution was 22.5% under the age of 18, 6.3% from 18 to 24, 32.1% from 25 to 44, 24.4% from 45 to 64, and 14.7% 65 or older. The median age was 39 years. For every 100 females, there were 89.3 males. For every 100 females age 18 and over, there were 87.2 males.

The median household income was $47,538 and the median family income  was $59,667. Males had a median income of $43,672 versus $31,354 for females. The per capita income for the CDP was $23,404. About 3.9% of families and 5.8% of the population were below the poverty line, including 5.6% of those under age 18 and 3.6% of those age 65 or over.

History

Clinton traces its history from 1663, when the land was known as Hammonasset between Guilford and Saybrook, as they were then bounded. A committee was appointed by the General Court at Hartford to lay out this area as a plantation. In 1667, the settlement was designated a town and named Kenilworth; this name became Killingworth by the middle of the eighteenth century, through changes in use. In 1838, the southern portion was incorporated by the General Assembly as the Town of Clinton, the northern portion retaining the name of Killingworth. The town was named after New York Governor DeWitt Clinton. The line between Killingworth and Clinton had also divided the earlier ecclesiastical societies (or school societies) which were established in 1735.

Connecticut Colony's General Court granted a charter in 1701 for "the founding of a collegiate school within His Majesty's Colony of Connecticut," and its founders chose Abraham Pierson as its rector. Pierson was one of the early leaders of Clinton's church, and the first classes were held in his parsonage in Clinton. The school was later moved to Saybrook and then to New Haven, where it eventually became Yale University. In the 20th century, Clinton prospered as a suburban bedroom community of New Haven.

Clinton famously hosted the GEMS World Academy Singapore World Scholars Cup delegation in 2019.

Transportation

The Shore Line East train stops at Clinton station with service to New Haven and New London

The Estuary Transit District provides public transportation throughout Clinton and the surrounding towns through its 9 Town Transit Service. Services include connections to the Old Saybrook Train Station, served by Amtrak and Shoreline East railroads.

Points of interest

The eastern half of the town center (east of the Indian River) is listed on the National Register of Historic Places as a historic district known as the Clinton Village Historic District. The central portion of the historic district containing the town green is locally known as the Liberty Green Historic District.

The Clinton Historical Society runs the Buell Tool Museum and the Clinton Historical Society Museum in Andrews Memorial Town Hall. The society's 1750 Elisha White House (known as Old Brick), the oldest brick home between New Haven and New London, has antique furniture, paintings, toys and quilts.

The Henry Carter Hull Library has a total of 14,938 cardholders and loaned 111,262 items to patrons in the fiscal year of 2019-2020. Clinton Crossing Premium Outlets, a Simon Center shopping outlet, offers designer and fashion-brand outlets for local and international shoppers.

Bluefish

Clinton is known as the bluefish capital of the world.

Clinton used to be home to the annual bluefish festival. The festival featured carnival games, concerts, food, raffles, and private vendors. The Bluefish Festival was held annually at the Clinton marina each summer. In the summer of 2008, it was held at the Clinton Town Hall due to marina construction. The festival location remained at the town hall until the summer of 2015 when it officially ended.

Notable people

 Jared Eliot, minister, physician, agriculturalist
 Erica Hill, NBC's Weekend Today 
 Jefferson Mays, actor
 Charles Morgan, railroad and shipping magnate
 Abraham Pierson, one of the founders of Yale University
 Dr. Seuss, children's book writer summered here
 Christopher Sweeney, artist
 Horatio Wright, Civil War general and later, Chief of Army Corps of Engineers

References

External links

Town website
The Clinton Historical Society
The Henry Carter Hull Library
The Kelseytown Gazette: Clinton's History

 
Towns in Middlesex County, Connecticut
Populated coastal places in Connecticut
Towns in Connecticut
Greater Hartford